Fred Ford  may refer to:

Fred Ford (American football) (born 1938), former American football halfback
Fred Ford (musician) (1930–1999), American blues/jazz artist composer/arranger and educator
Fred Ford (footballer) (born 1916), former footballer and manager
Fred Ford (programmer), video game programmer

See also 
Ford (surname)